Shirley is an unincorporated community in the town of Glenmore, Brown County, Wisconsin, United States. It is located on Wisconsin Highway 96.

History
The community was supposedly named after a paint brand sold at Zellner's General Store in Shirley.

Economy
Shirley Wind, a wind farm, is located in the community.

Notes

Unincorporated communities in Brown County, Wisconsin
Unincorporated communities in Wisconsin
Green Bay metropolitan area